Weirton is a city in Brooke and Hancock counties in the U.S. state of West Virginia.  Located primarily in Hancock County, the city lies in the northern portions of the state's Northern Panhandle region.  As of the 2020 census, the city's population was 19,163. Weirton is a principal city of the Weirton–Steubenville metropolitan area, which had a population of 116,903 residents in 2020. Additionally, Weirton is a major city in the western part of the Pittsburgh–New Castle–Weirton combined statistical area.

History

Holliday's Cove Fort was a Revolutionary War fortification constructed in 1774 by soldiers from Fort Pitt. It was located in what is now downtown Weirton, along Harmons Creek (named for Harmon Greathouse), about three miles from its mouth on the Ohio River. It was commanded by Colonel Andrew Van Swearingen (1741–1793) and later by his son-in-law, Captain Samuel Brady (1756–1795), the famous leader of Brady's Rangers. In 1779, over 28 militia were garrisoned at Hollidays Cove. Two years earlier, Colonel Van Swearingen led a dozen soldiers by longboat down the Ohio to help rescue the inhabitants of Ft. Henry in Wheeling in a siege by the British and Indian tribes in 1777. That mission was memorialized in a WPA-era mural painted on the wall of the Cove Post Office by Charles S. Chapman (1879–1962). The mural features Col. John Bilderback, who later gained infamy as the leader of the massacre of the Moravian Indians in Gnadenhutten in 1782.

A small village called Holliday's Cove — which is now most of downtown Weirton — was founded on the site in 1793. In 1909, Ernest T. Weir arrived from neighboring Pittsburgh and built a steel mill, later known as the Weirton Steel Corporation, just north of Holliday's Cove. An unincorporated settlement called Weirton grew up around the mill that, by 1940, was said to be the largest unincorporated city in the United States. By then Hollidays Cove and two other outlying areas,  Weirton Heights, and Marland Heights, which as their names suggest were on hilltops or ridges surrounding the "Weir–Cove" area, had also incorporated.

On July 1, 1947, all of these areas — Hollidays Cove, Marland Heights, Weirton Heights, and unincorporated Weirton — merged and formed the city of Weirton as it currently exists. Thomas E. Millsop, the head of the Weirton Steel division of the other Ernest T. Weir company, National Steel Corporation, was elected as the city's first mayor. The city charter was approved by voters in 1950.

The Weirton Steel Corporation was once a fully integrated steel mill employing over 12,000 people. At one point was the largest private employer and the largest taxpayer in West Virginia. Due to reorganization of the steel industry, not only within the United States but worldwide, the Weirton mill faced declines in production. During the early 1980s the employees of Weirton Steel endeavored to purchase the mill from National Steel Corporation as the largest Employee Stock Ownership Program in the nation, saving the mill from bankruptcy. However, by 2003 the corporation was forced to file bankruptcy after generating more than $700 million in losses since 1998. In 2004, International Steel Group acquired the 3,000-worker plant before merging with international giant ArcelorMittal. By 2016, only the tin-plating section of the mill, though still one of the country's largest tin-plate makers, was in operation with only 800 workers. In 2020, Ohio-based Cleveland-Cliffs purchased the tin mill.

Some civic leaders are attempting to attract businesses and homeowners from the neighboring Pittsburgh metropolitan area, marketing Weirton as a bedroom community, taking advantage of the close proximity to the Pittsburgh International Airport and Interstate 70.

Weirton is home to a number of sites on the National Register of Historic Places including: Johnston-Truax House, Marland Heights Park and Margaret Manson Weir Memorial Pool, People's Bank, Dr. George Rigas House, and the Peter Tarr Furnace Site.

Geography

The city of Weirton is located at  (40.4189, −80.5894). Therefore, it is one of only three communities in the United States that borders two other states on two sides, and its own state on the other two sides, the others being Hancock, Maryland and Memphis, Tennessee.

Surrounding areas
Weirton has three borders, including the cities of Follansbee to the south and New Cumberland to the north and the Pennsylvania/Washington County township of Hanover to the east.  Weirton is also adjacent to Steubenville, Ohio and is directly accessible via the Veterans' Memorial Bridge (U.S. Route 22).

Climate
Weirton has a humid continental climate (Köppen climate classification: Dfa), with warm summers and chilly to cold winters.

 Annual Average High Temperatures:  °F (summer)  (winter)
 Annual Average Low Temperatures  (summer)  (winter)
 Highest Recorded Temperature:  (1988)
 Lowest Recorded Temperature:  (1994)
 Warmest Month: July
 Coolest Month: January
 Highest Precipitation: June
 Annual Precipitation:

Demographics

By 2011, the city and its two counties had attracted the attention of the New York Times which noted the town was dwindling in population. The article reported that Brooke County had just 71 live births for every 100 deaths and that Hancock County was in similar straits. This has led, the article claimed, to a reduction in civic institutions.

2010 census
As of the census of 2010, there were 19,746 people, 8,839 households, and 5,507 families living in the city. The racial makeup of the city was 93.7% White, 3.9% African American, 0.1% Native American, 0.5% Asian, 0.2% from other races, and 1.6% from two or more races. Hispanic or Latino of any race were 1.0% of the population.

There were 8,839 households, of which 24.8% had children under the age of 18 living with them, 44.8% were married couples living together, 13.0% had a female householder with no husband present, 4.5% had a male householder with no wife present, and 37.7% were non-families. 32.9% of all households were made up of individuals, and 15.1% had someone living alone who was 65 years of age or older. The average household size was 2.22 and the average family size was 2.78.

The median age in the city was 46 years. 19.4% of residents were under the age of 18; 6.3% were between the ages of 18 and 24; 23% were from 25 to 44; 30.8% were from 45 to 64; and 20.6% were 65 years of age or older. The gender makeup of the city was 47.3% male and 52.7% female.

2000 census
As of the census of 2000, there were 20,411 people, 8,958 households, and 5,885 families living in the city. The population density was 1,142.2 people per square mile (441.0/km2). There were 9,546 housing units at an average density of 534.2 per square mile (206.3/km2). The racial makeup of the city was 94.52% White, 3.86% African American, 0.11% Native American, 0.59% Asian, 0.01% Pacific Islander, 0.14% from other races, and 0.77% from two or more races. Hispanic or Latino of any race were 0.68% of the population.

There were 8,958 households, out of which 23.8% had children under the age of 18 living with them, 51.4% were married couples living together, 10.6% had a female householder with no husband present, and 34.3% were non-families. 30.8% of all households were made up of individuals, and 15.9% had someone living alone who was 65 years of age or older. The average household size was 2.25 and the average family size was 2.79.

In the city, the population was spread out, with 19.2% under the age of 18, 6.6% from 18 to 24, 26.5% from 25 to 44, 25.4% from 45 to 64, and 22.3% who were 65 years of age or older. The median age was 44 years. For every 100 females, there were 88.6 males. For every 100 females age 18 and over, there were 85.6 males.

The median income for a household in the city was $35,212, and the median income for a family was $42,466. Males had a median income of $37,129 versus $19,745 for females. The per capita income for the city was $18,853. About 8.0% of families and 10.3% of the population were below the poverty line, including 14.0% of those under age 18 and 7.9% of those age 65 or over.

Economy

Historically, Weirton's economy, as well as that of the region, was dominated by the steel industry, with the biggest employer being ArcelorMittal. Over the years as the steel industry declined, the local economy has become more diversified, with retail services and medical services recording the largest increases. Weirton Medical Center is a large 238 bed hospital that services patients from all over the region, and is one of the city's largest employers today employing over 1,000 people.

Due to the area's close proximity to Pittsburgh, Pennsylvania, there is also a growing number of workers who work in Pittsburgh and commute from Weirton.

Government
The following people have been elected Mayor of Weirton since the city's incorporation in 1947:

Police 
There have been three fatal shootings by police officers in the history of the Weirton department.  The third, in 2016, was a case of suicide by cop.  The first officer on the scene recognized the situation, determined that the situation posed no immediate threat, and started talking to the distressed citizen, who was holding an unloaded gun and telling the officer to "Just shoot me". An officer who arrived subsequently shot the man dead on his fourth attempt, less than 10 seconds after arriving on the scene.

The police department fired the first officer for not killing the man first.  The police chief said in sworn testimony that although he had fired the officer for not shooting the man soon enough, the department's policy prohibits officers from shooting people whom they believe do not pose a threat.  Shortly after this admission that the officer was fired for correctly following the department policy on the legitimate use of force, the city settled a lawsuit for wrongful termination.

Education
Children in Weirton are served by the Hancock County School District. The current schools serving the city are:
 Weirton Elementary School – grades K-4
 Weir Middle School – grades 5-8
 Weir High School – grades 9-12

In popular culture

Weirton was the subject of a photo essay, "Weir's Weirton," in the Life issue of September 13, 1937. The issue's front cover featured a portrait of Ernest Tener Weir.

Weirton has attracted the attention of Hollywood filmmakers and writers on several occasions:
Weirton was one of several Ohio Valley towns that served as film locations for the acclaimed 1978 film, The Deer Hunter, starring Robert De Niro and Meryl Streep.
Six years later it served as the primary location for filming of Reckless starring Aidan Quinn and Daryl Hannah.
The movie Super 8 was filmed in downtown Weirton, as well as many other places throughout the town, in late September to mid October 2010. The town stood in for the fictional town of Lillian, Ohio.
Disney featured Weirton briefly in its documentary, America's Heart and Soul. During the excerpt, employees of Weirton Steel discuss their concerns with foreign imports and what it is doing to the size of their mill.
Weirton was also the inspiration and guidance in the 1989 book No Star Nights. According to the author biography included in the book, author Anna Smucker drew upon her memories growing up in Weirton for a tale about childhood spent in an industrial town.
In the novel The Egyptian Cross Mystery, Ellery Queen spent some time in Weirton while investigating a murder in the small village of Arroyo, West Virginia.
Weirton is mentioned in the song by Daniel Johnston, Natalie, Queen of Weirton

Notable people
 James J. Andrews, Union spy during the Civil War
 Bob Gain, football player for the Cleveland Browns; 1950 Outland Trophy winner
 Jerry A. Hausman, noted economist at MIT and developer of the Hausman specification test
 Bob Jeter, football player for the Green Bay Packers and Chicago Bears; three-time NFL champion
 Gary Jeter, football player for the New York Giants, Los Angeles Rams and New England Patriots
 Kevin Miller, football player for the Minnesota Vikings and Birmingham Stallions
 Ken Reed, member of the West Virginia House of Delegates
 Mike Rodak, football player for the Cleveland Rams, Detroit Lions, and Pittsburgh Steelers
 Karen Staley, singer-songwriter
 Ernest T. Weir, founder of the National Steel Corporation
 Ronald Robert Williams, basketball player for West Virginia University, San Francisco Warriors, Milwaukee Bucks, and Los Angeles Lakers.
 Quincy Wilson, football player for West Virginia University and the Cincinnati Bengals

See also
 List of cities and towns along the Ohio River
 Veterans Memorial Bridge
 Market Street Bridge (Steubenville)
 National Register of Historic Places listings in Hancock County, West Virginia

References

External links
 City of Weirton
 Weirton Daily, local newspaper
 History of Weirton

 
Cities in West Virginia
Cities in Brooke County, West Virginia
Cities in Hancock County, West Virginia
Populated places established in 1947
1947 establishments in West Virginia
West Virginia populated places on the Ohio River